Pieter Goemans (1925-2000) was a Dutch composer, probably best known for having written the classic song "Aan de Amsterdamse grachten".

Biography
Goemans was born on 6 June 1925 in Amsterdam. The son of a diplomat, his father forced him to write under a pseudonym to avoid any association between the family and the popular entertainment industry. Under the name Peter Shott he wrote, in 1949, the song "Aan de Amsterdamse grachten"; Goemans was inspired to write the song in 1949 while walking across the bridge where the Prinsengracht and the Leidsegracht intersect. It wasn't supplied with sheet music and recorded until 1956, when an arrangement was written by pianist Dick Schallies (then a member of the Metropole Orkest) since (Schallies explained) Goemans couldn't write music. Henk Visscher, singer as well as guitar and bass player with Johnny Kraaijkamp, was the first to sing and record the song,

In the 1960s Goemans was one of the regular lyricists for Corry Brokken, translating foreign material. One of his tunes, "Bach bijvoorbeeld", was sung by Shirley Zwerus and produced by Willem Duys used as the opening tune for his weekly radio program. In 1970, Hearts of Soul won the Nationaal Songfestival with the Goemans song "Waterman"; the song finished seventh at the Eurovision Song Contest 1970.

Goemans died on 8 July 2000. The bridge on which "Aan de Amsterdamse grachten" came to him was marked with a plaque and later named for him; his ashes were spread over the Prinsengracht.

References

External links
 Pieter Goemans at muziekencyclopedie.nl

1925 births
2000 deaths
Dutch composers
Dutch songwriters
Musicians from Amsterdam